The Uppsala Synod in 1593 was the most important synod of the Lutheran Church of Sweden. Sweden had gone through its Protestant Reformation and broken with Roman Catholicism in the 1520s, but an official confession of faith had never been declared.

History
The synod was summoned to Uppsala by Duke Charles, heir to the Swedish throne. Four bishops and over 300 priests were also present. The synod was opened on March 1, by Nils Göransson Gyllenstierna, and on the following day Nicolaus Olai Bothniensis, a professor of theology at the Uppsala University, was elected chairman.

By March 5, the synod had decided to declare the Holy Scripture the sole guideline for religion. The three creeds—the Apostles', the Nicene, and the Athanasian—were officially recognized, and the unaltered Lutheran Augsburg Confession (1530) was adopted.

After the unanimous acceptance of the unaltered Augsburg Confession, Nicolaus Olai Bothniensis, who was presiding, exclaimed, "Now Sweden is one man, and we all have one Lord and God."

Another important decision was that only the Lutheran doctrine was to be allowed; Calvinism, Roman Catholicism, and Zwinglianism were all officially banned. The Catholic-inclined liturgy of King John III of Sweden (1537–1592) was also rejected.

On March 15, Abraham Angermannus was elected Archbishop of Uppsala.

The meeting closed on March 20, after its decrees were signed—first by Duke Charles, members of the council, and bishops, and then by representatives from all over the country.

Signatories of the Uppsala Synod 
Signatories of the Uppsala Synod were, among others:
 Christopherus Stephani Bellinus
 Johannes Stephani Bellinus
 Nicolaus Olai Bothniensis
 Laurentius Paulinus Gothus
 Olaus Canuti Helsingius
 Petrus Kenicius
 Olaus Martini
 Ericus Erici Sorolainen

References 

 Kyrkomöte, in Nordisk familjebok (1911) 

1593 in Sweden
16th-century church councils
1593 in Christianity
Swedish Reformation
Protestant councils and synods
History of Uppsala